SEGi University and Colleges (SEGi) first opened its doors as Systematic College in 1977 in Kuala Lumpur’s commercial district. SEGi now serves 20,000 students in five major campuses located in Kota Damansara, Kuala Lumpur, Subang Jaya, Penang, and Sarawak.

SEGi now offers a platform known as RISE. SEGiRISE enables working adults to upgrade their qualifications whilst accommodating their work schedule.

History
In 1977, SEGi University Group (SEGi) was known as Systematic College. Today, SEGi has as many as 20,000 students, in five major campuses located in the Klang Valley, Penang and Sarawak.

Campuses

Main Campus

SEGi's main campus, in Kota Damansara, houses several faculties including Business, Technology and Innovation, Creative Arts and Design, and Dentistry. The most recently built facility, Kota Damansara MRT Station, provides access to students from Petaling Jaya and Kuala Lumpur.

The campus has facilities including an academic library and swimming pool. It can accommodate up to 12,000 students. An extension building known as SEGi Tower is a few hundred metres away to accommodate an additional 6,000 students.

SEGi College Subang Jaya
SEGi College Subang Jaya first opened in January 2006. It can accommodate up to 6,500 students. Students from this campus have free access to sports facilities at the 3K Sports Complex opposite the main building.

SEGi College Kuala Lumpur
This campus opened its door in 1977. It has since expanded from one building to five buildings. Currently, the college has approximately 4,000 students studying on a full-time or part-time basis.

SEGi College Penang
SEGi College Penang serves as SEGi's education hub to students in the northern region of Malaysia. The campus is in Green Hall. The campus offers a wide range of programmes at different levels in the fields of business, accounting, human resources, early childhood education, mass communication, information technology, hotel management and tourism.

SEGi College Sarawak
Located in the capital city, Kuching, it is one of the largest private colleges in East Malaysia. This is the only campus that offers law programmes at diploma and bachelor's degree levels.

References

External links
 Official website

 
Universities and colleges in Selangor
1977 establishments in Malaysia
Educational institutions established in 1977
Private universities and colleges in Malaysia